Clos des Lambrays is an Appellation d'origine contrôlée (AOC) and Grand Cru vineyard for red wine in the Côte de Nuits subregion  of Burgundy, with Pinot noir as the main grape variety. It is situated in the commune of Morey-Saint-Denis in the Côte-d'Or département, and is located immediately to the southwest of the village Morey-Saint-Denis. The Clos part of its name refers to a wall-enclosed vineyard. Clos des Lambrays was elevated from premier cru to grand cru status in 1981, which meant that it was created as a separate AOC.

Clos de Lambrays totals  and most of it is owned by the winery Domaine des Lambrays. However, Domaine Taupenot-Merme also has a small holding in this vineyard, so Domaine des Lambrays is unable to put a "Monopole" label on its bottles.

Production
In 2008,  of vineyard surface was in production within the AOC, and 236 hectoliters of wine were produced, corresponding to slightly over 31,000 bottles.

AOC regulations
The main grape variety for Clos des Lambrays is Pinot noir. The AOC regulations also allow up to 15 per cent total of Chardonnay, Pinot blanc and Pinot gris as accessory grapes, but this is practically never used for any Burgundy Grand Cru vineyard. The allowed base yield is 35 hectoliter per hectare, a minimum planting density of 9,000 vines per hectare is required as well as a minimum grape maturity of 11.5 per cent potential alcohol.

See also
List of Burgundy Grand Crus

References

Burgundy (historical region) AOCs
LVMH brands